Sullivan High School may refer to:

Sullivan High School (Chicago, Illinois)
 Sullivan High School (Sullivan, Illinois)
 Sullivan High School (Sullivan, Indiana)